Beryllium oxide (BeO), also known as beryllia, is an inorganic compound with the formula BeO. This colourless solid is a notable electrical insulator with a higher thermal conductivity than any other non-metal except diamond, and exceeds that of most metals. As an amorphous solid, beryllium oxide is white. Its high melting point leads to its use as a refractory material. It occurs in nature as the mineral bromellite. Historically and in materials science, beryllium oxide was called glucina or glucinium oxide, owing to its sweet taste.

Preparation and chemical properties
Beryllium oxide can be prepared by calcining (roasting) beryllium carbonate, dehydrating beryllium hydroxide, or igniting metallic beryllium:
BeCO3 → BeO + CO2
Be(OH)2 → BeO + H2O
2 Be + O2 → 2 BeO
Igniting beryllium in air gives a mixture of BeO and the nitride Be3N2.  Unlike the oxides formed by the other Group 2 elements (alkaline earth metals), beryllium oxide is amphoteric rather than basic.

Beryllium oxide formed at high temperatures (>800 °C) is inert, but dissolves easily in hot aqueous ammonium bifluoride (NH4HF2) or a solution of hot concentrated sulfuric acid (H2SO4) and ammonium sulfate ((NH4)2SO4).

Structure
BeO crystallizes in the hexagonal wurtzite structure, featuring tetrahedral Be2+ and O2− centres, like lonsdaleite and w-BN (with both of which it is isoelectronic).  In contrast, the oxides of the larger group-2 metals, i.e., MgO, CaO, SrO, BaO, crystallize in the cubic rock salt motif with octahedral geometry about the dications and dianions. At high temperature the structure transforms to a tetragonal form.

In the vapour phase, beryllium oxide is present as discrete diatomic molecules. In the language of valence bond theory, these molecules can be described as adopting sp orbital hybridisation on both atoms, featuring one σ (between one sp orbital on each atom) and one π bond (between aligned p orbitals on each atom oriented perpendicular to the molecular axis). Molecular orbital theory provides a slightly different picture with no net sigma bonding (because the 2s orbitals of the two atoms combine to form a filled sigma bonding orbital and a filled sigma* anti-bonding orbital) and two pi bonds formed between both pairs of p orbitals oriented perpendicular to the molecular axis. The sigma orbital formed by the p orbitals aligned along the molecular axis is unfilled. The corresponding ground state is ...(2sσ)2(2sσ*)2(2pπ)4 (as in the isoelectronic C2 molecule), where both bonds can be considered as dative bonds from oxygen towards beryllium.

Applications
High-quality crystals may be grown hydrothermally, or otherwise by the Verneuil method. For the most part, beryllium oxide is produced as a white amorphous powder, sintered into larger shapes. Impurities, like carbon, can give a variety of colours to the otherwise colourless host crystals.

Sintered beryllium oxide is a very stable ceramic. Beryllium oxide is used in rocket engines and as a transparent protective over-coating on aluminised telescope mirrors.

Beryllium oxide is used in many high-performance semiconductor parts for applications such as radio equipment because it has good thermal conductivity while also being a good electrical insulator. It is used as a filler in some thermal interface materials such as thermal grease. Some power semiconductor devices have used beryllium oxide ceramic between the silicon chip and the metal mounting base of the package to achieve a lower value of thermal resistance than a similar construction of aluminium oxide. It is also used as a structural ceramic for high-performance microwave devices, vacuum tubes, magnetrons, and gas lasers. BeO has been proposed as a neutron moderator for naval marine high-temperature gas-cooled reactors (MGCR), as well as NASA's Kilopower nuclear reactor for space applications.

Safety
BeO is carcinogenic in powdered form and may cause a chronic allergic-type lung disease berylliosis. Once fired into solid form, it is safe to handle if not subjected to machining that generates dust. Clean breakage releases little dust, but crushing or grinding actions can pose a risk.

References

External links
Beryllium Oxide MSDS from American Beryllia
IARC Monograph "Beryllium and Beryllium Compounds"
International Chemical Safety Card 1325
National Pollutant Inventory – Beryllium and compounds
NIOSH Pocket guide to Chemical Hazards

Beryllium compounds
Oxides
IARC Group 1 carcinogens
Ceramic materials
Nuclear technology
II-VI semiconductors
Wurtzite structure type